This is a list of museums in Somalia.

Museums
National Museum of Somalia
Saryan Museum

See also
List of museums

References

See also

External links
Museums in Somalia - National Museum in Mogadishu

 
Somalia
Museums
Museums
Museums
Somalia